The NG postcode area, also known as the Nottingham postcode area, is a group of 29 postcode districts in the East Midlands of England, which are subdivisions of seven post towns. These cover central Nottinghamshire (including Nottingham, Mansfield, Sutton-in-Ashfield, Newark-on-Trent and Southwell), parts of south-west Lincolnshire (including Grantham and Sleaford) and small parts of Derbyshire and Leicestershire. The NG postcode area is one of six with a population above 1 million.



Coverage
The approximate coverage of the postcode districts:

|-
! NG1
| NOTTINGHAM
| Nottingham city centre
| Nottingham
|-
! NG2
| NOTTINGHAM
| Nottingham city centre, Colwick Park, Sneinton, The Meadows, West Bridgford
| Nottingham, Rushcliffe
|-
! NG3
| NOTTINGHAM
| Carlton, Sneinton, St Ann's, Mapperley
| Gedling, Nottingham
|-
! NG4
| NOTTINGHAM
| Gedling Village, Netherfield, Carlton, Colwick
| Gedling
|-
! NG5
| NOTTINGHAM
| Sherwood, Arnold, Woodthorpe, Bestwood, Carrington, Top Valley, Rise Park
| Nottingham, Gedling
|-
! NG6
| NOTTINGHAM
| Bestwood Village, Bulwell, Old Basford
| Nottingham, Gedling
|-
! NG7
| NOTTINGHAM
| New Basford, Forest Fields, Hyson Green, Radford, Lenton
| Nottingham
|-
! NG8
| NOTTINGHAM
| Aspley, Wollaton, Whitemoor, Bilborough, Strelley
| Nottingham, Broxtowe
|-
! NG9
| NOTTINGHAM
| Beeston, Stapleford, Lenton Abbey, Chilwell, Trowell, Bramcote
| Broxtowe, Nottingham
|-
! NG10
| NOTTINGHAM
| Long Eaton, Sawley, Sandiacre 
| Erewash
|-
! NG11
| NOTTINGHAM
| Clifton, Ruddington, Gotham, Kingston on Soar
| Nottingham, Rushcliffe
|-
! NG12
| NOTTINGHAM
| Cotgrave, Radcliffe on Trent, Keyworth, Edwalton
| Rushcliffe
|-
! NG13
| NOTTINGHAM
| Bingham, Whatton, Bottesford, Aslockton
| Rushcliffe, Melton
|-
! NG14
| NOTTINGHAM
| Calverton, Lowdham, Burton Joyce, Gunthorpe
| Gedling
|-
! NG15
| NOTTINGHAM 
|Hucknall, Ravenshead, Newstead
| Ashfield, Gedling
|-
! NG16
| NOTTINGHAM
| Kimberley, Eastwood, Nuthall, Langley Mill, Pinxton, Selston, Awsworth, Ironville, Jacksdale, Westwood, Underwood, Brinsley, Watnall
| Amber Valley, Ashfield, Bolsover, Broxtowe
|-
!rowspan=2|NG17
| NOTTINGHAM
| Kirkby-in-Ashfield
|rowspan=2|Ashfield
|-
| SUTTON-IN-ASHFIELD
| Sutton-in-Ashfield, Stanton Hill, Skegby
|-
! NG18
| MANSFIELD
| Mansfield
| Mansfield
|-
! NG19
| MANSFIELD
| Mansfield Woodhouse, Forest Town
| Mansfield
|-
! NG20
| MANSFIELD
| Shirebrook, Market Warsop
| Bolsover, Mansfield
|-
! NG21
| MANSFIELD
| Rainworth, Edwinstowe, Clipstone, Blidworth
| Newark and Sherwood
|-
! NG22
| NEWARK
| Bilsthorpe, Newark-on-Trent
| Newark and Sherwood
|-
! NG23
| NEWARK
| Newark-on-Trent, Collingham, Long Bennington
| Newark and Sherwood
|-
! NG24
| NEWARK
| Newark-on-Trent, Balderton
| Newark and Sherwood 
|-
! NG25
| SOUTHWELL
| Southwell
| Newark and Sherwood
|-
! NG31
| GRANTHAM
| Grantham
| South Kesteven
|-
! NG32
| GRANTHAM
| Grantham, Croxton Kerrial, Sedgebrook
| South Kesteven, Melton
|-
! NG33
| GRANTHAM
| Grantham, Castle Bytham, Corby Glen
| South Kesteven
|-
! NG34
| SLEAFORD
| Sleaford, Scredington
| North Kesteven
|-
! style="background:#FFFFFF;"|NG70
| style="background:#FFFFFF;"|MANSFIELD
| style="background:#FFFFFF;"|Special Business Reply Service
| style="background:#FFFFFF;"|non-geographic
|-
! style="background:#FFFFFF;"|NG80
| style="background:#FFFFFF;"|NOTTINGHAM
| style="background:#FFFFFF;"|Experian
| style="background:#FFFFFF;"|non-geographic
|-
! style="background:#FFFFFF;"|NG90
| style="background:#FFFFFF;"|NOTTINGHAM
| style="background:#FFFFFF;"|Boots UK
| style="background:#FFFFFF;"|non-geographic
|}

Map

See also
Postcode Address File
List of postcode areas in the United Kingdom

References

External links
Royal Mail's Postcode Address File
A quick introduction to Royal Mail's Postcode Address File (PAF)

Nottingham
Postcode areas covering the East Midlands